This is a list of episodes for South of Nowhere. The series premiered on November 4, 2005 on Noggin's teen-targeted programming block, The N, and ended on December 12, 2008. 40 episodes of the series were produced in total.

Series overview
{| class="wikitable plainrowheaders" style="text-align:center;"
|-
! colspan="2" rowspan="2" |Season
! rowspan="2" |Episodes
! colspan="2" |Originally aired
|-
! First aired
! Last aired
|-
| bgcolor="38A969" |
| [[List of South of Nowhere episodes#Season 1: 2005–06|1]]
| 11
| November 4, 2005
| February 3, 2006
|-
| bgcolor="999999" |
| [[List of South of Nowhere episodes#Season 2: 2006|2]]
| 13
| September 29, 2006
| December 22, 2006
|-
| bgcolor="000000" |
| [[List of South of Nowhere episodes#Season 3: 2007–08|3]]
| 16
| August 10, 2007
| December 12, 2008
|}

Episodes

Season 1: 2005–06
The first season originally aired as part of The N, a teen block on the Noggin channel, in the United States from November 4, 2005 to February 3, 2006. The season consisted of 11 episodes, all of which aired on Friday nights.

Production
Thomas W. Lynch first had the idea for South of Nowhere when one of his close conservative friends told Lynch that his son had just come out to him. The man asked his son, "How do you know you're gay?" and the son responded, "How do you know you're straight?" When Lynch heard this, he says, he "knew there was a series in there about identity." He wondered why such a noteworthy event—an adolescent's coming out to their parents—had never before been explored as an ongoing subject on a television series. He "sat with the idea for a few days" and then wrote an outline of the show's pilot over a few weeks. In an effort to maintain authenticity in depicting teenage experiences, Lynch spoke to high school counselors and asked drama students at a Los Angeles high school for feedback. He pitched the series—which he was then calling "Out"—to The N executives Amy Friedman and Essie Chambers, who then commissioned him to write the pilot script.

Gabrielle Christian first auditioned for the role of Spencer (then called "Zooey") in July 2004, though Lynch also had her read for Ashley's part. Mandy Musgrave also auditioned for the role of Spencer, but Lynch liked her chemistry with Christian, so he paired the two up with Musgrave as Ashley. The pilot was first shot in October 2004 and directed by Rose Troche, but after the series was picked up by The N in January 2005, Lynch decided to recast many of the characters. He said that "I didn't pick [Christian] up right away, I had her keep re-auditioning. ... I [had] to make sure that this combination [was] perfect." Her contract was finally picked up in May 2005 and the pilot was re-filmed with the new cast in July. Filming took place in Los Angeles, with a correctional facility used largely as the high school set. Donna Deitch, who directed the second version of the pilot but no subsequent South of Nowhere episodes said that the pilot is "something I'm really, really proud of, because I think that show has a look, a style to it that really helps". She felt that the style she set suited the material and was "fairly inventive" for a low-budget series.

Season 2: 2006
The second season originally aired between September 29, 2006 and December 22, 2006 on The N, a teen block on the Noggin channel. The season consisted of 13 episodes all airing on Friday nights.

Season 3: 2007–08
The third and final season originally aired between August 10, 2007 and December 12, 2008 on Noggin's teen branch, The N. The season consisted of sixteen episodes all airing on Friday nights.

References

External links
 

Lists of American teen drama television series episodes